The Hadley Furniture Company Building is a historic retail building at 651-659 Main Street in downtown Worcester, Massachusetts.  The five story brick building was built in 1923–24 to a design by the local architectural firm of Cutting, Carleton & Cutting.  The Hadley Furniture Company, founded in 1914, sought to expand from earlier premises closer to City Hall, and commissioned its construction.  As a representative of a significant specialty retail presence in the city, and for its architectural styling, it was listed on the National Register of Historic Places in 2011.

See also
National Register of Historic Places listings in southwestern Worcester, Massachusetts
National Register of Historic Places listings in Worcester County, Massachusetts

References

Commercial buildings on the National Register of Historic Places in Massachusetts
Commercial buildings completed in 1870
National Register of Historic Places in Worcester County, Massachusetts